Men Suddenly in Love is a 2011 Hong Kong romantic comedy film produced by, written by and directed by Wong Jing. Film stars Eric Tsang, Chapman To, Jim Chim, Wong Jing and Tat Dik.

Cast
 Eric Tsang as York Ng (吳郁仁)
 Chapman To as Keith Szeto (司徒奇峰)
 Jim Chim as Claude Cheung (張秋雲)
 Wong Jing as Sam Fu (傅武琛)
 Tat Dik as Charlie Lam (林查理)
 Richard Ng as Master Jude (朱老師)
 Chrissie Chau as Tina
 Carol Yeung as Jeanne (小倩)
 Jessica Xu as Audrey
 Caroline Zhu as Peril Ngai (倪險)
 Betrys Kong as Eleven
 Maggie Cheung as Hillary Lau (劉玉卿)
 Monica Chan as Nana Lam (林娜娜)
 Mak Ling Ling as Du Gu Ling Ling (獨孤靈靈)
 Jacqueline Chong as Lam Cha Lei's wife (林查理妻)
 Yeung Sze Man as Cheung Chau Wan's wife (張秋雲妻)
 Lee Kin-yan

External links
 
 Men Suddenly in Love at Hong Kong Cinemagic
 

2011 films
2011 romantic comedy films
2010s Cantonese-language films
Hong Kong romantic comedy films
Films directed by Wong Jing
2010s Hong Kong films